Sonoma Magazine is a magazine published by SMI Media about the Napa Valley and Sonoma Valley areas of California. The offices are in Santa Rosa, California.

Awards
 2019 Eppy Award (of Editor & Publisher): best digital magazine with under one million unique monthly visitors (tie)
 It received five finalist selections in the 2019 National City and Regional Magazine Awards, with the University of Missouri School of Journalism managing the award process, bestowed by the City and Regional Magazine Association (CRMA)

References

External links
 Sonoma Magazine
Magazines published in the San Francisco Bay Area
Local interest magazines published in the United States
Santa Rosa, California